Harold Milton Hull (May 16, 1920 – May 5, 1988) was an American professional basketball player. He played in the National Basketball League for the Akron Goodyear Wingfoots during the 1941–42 season and averaged 1.2 points per game. After his basketball career he earned a juris doctor from the University of Missouri and opened a private practice in Maryville, Missouri.

References

1920 births
1988 deaths
Akron Goodyear Wingfoots players
American men's basketball players
Basketball players from Missouri
Forwards (basketball)
Missouri lawyers
Northwest Missouri State Bearcats men's basketball players
People from Nodaway County, Missouri
University of Missouri School of Law alumni
20th-century American lawyers